Ancistrus variolus is a species of catfish in the family Loricariidae. It is native to South America, where it occurs in the Ampiyacu River basin in Peru. The species reaches 4.8 cm (1.9 inches) SL.

References 

Fish described in 1872
variolus
Fauna of Peru